The Knowledge Quarter is a knowledge cluster, located in a small area of London around King's Cross, the Euston Road and Bloomsbury.

The partners of the Knowledge Quarter include The British Library, The British Museum, Google, The Alan Turing Institute, Francis Crick Institute, SpringerNature/Holtzbrinck, The Wellcome Trust, The Guardian, Paul Hamlyn Foundation, Royal College of Physicians, UCL, SOAS, University of London and Working Men's College amongst others.

See also
Knowledge Quarter, Liverpool

References

External links 
 http://www.knowledgequarter.london/

Areas of London